Dita Jeřábková (born ) is a retired Czech female volleyball player. She was part of the Czech Republic women's national volleyball team.

She participated in the 1994 FIVB Volleyball Women's World Championship. On club level she played with PVK Olymp Praha.

Clubs
  PVK Olymp Praha (1994)
  Isola Tongeren (1999-2001)

References

External links
Player page at cvf.cz 

1974 births
Living people
Czech women's volleyball players
Place of birth missing (living people)
Czech expatriate sportspeople in Belgium
Expatriate volleyball players in Belgium